The 2019 Afghan Premier League was the eighth season of Afghan Premier League, the Afghan league for association football clubs, since its establishment in 2012. The season commenced on 20 August 2019. Toofan Harirod F.C successfully defended their title by defeating Shaheen Asmayee F.C in the final, 1-0 a.e.t.

Teams
The following eight teams, which represent the country's eight main regions, participate in the 2019 Afghan Premier League.
De Abasin Sape
De Maiwand Atalan
De Spin Ghar Bazan
Mawjhai Amu
Oqaban Hindukush
Shaheen Asmayee
Simorgh Alborz
Toofaan Harirod

Group stage
The draw for the group stage was held on 15 August 2019.

Group A

Group B

Knockout stage

References

External links

Afghan Premier League seasons
Afghanistan
2019 in Afghan football